Tony Bianco is an American jazz drummer and composer from New York City who moved to Europe in the early nineties. He has been described as a "true master of the drums ". He has played and recorded with many prominent jazz musicians including Elton Dean, Alexander von Schlippenbach, Dave Liebman, Paul Dunmall, and Evan Parker. In 2008 he brought Liebman and Parker together for a BBC recording which resulted in the album Relevance.

Bianco recorded a contemporary jazz album, In a Western Sense, featuring Zoe Rahman. He played with Elton Dean on his concept called "Freebeat", which resulted in two albums featuring Dean on Northern Lights and Liebman on Monkey Dance.

In 2009 he recorded Never Pet a Burning Dog with the band douBt with guitarist Michel Delville and pianist Alex Maguire. The album received four stars from Down Beat magazine. In the annual poll by Arnaldo DeSouteiro, Bianco was one of the top five drummers and douBt was the third best instrumental group.

In 2011, Bianco and Delville created the electro-jazz project Machine Mass, which was joined by Dave Liebman in 2012. Bianco is known for his "mercurial", "octopusian" drumming style, which combines the sounds of free jazz and straight jazz and reflects Bianco's "musical creed – to be "loose and tense, free and strict".

Selected discography 
 Sea of Infinity by Elton Dean (Hux, 1997)
 Hour Glass (Emanem, 2001)
 In a Western Sense (33 Jazz, 2003)
 Monkey Dance (FMR, 2003)
 Never Pet a Burning Dog by douBt (Moonjune, 2009)
 Spirits Past and Future (Duns-limited, 2009)
 Relevance (Red Toucan, 2010)
 As Real as Thinking by Machine Mass Trio (Moonjune 2011)

References

External links
  Official site
 All About Jazz

American jazz drummers
Living people
Year of birth missing (living people)
FMR Records artists
Emanem Records artists